It Comes Up Love is a 1943 American, black and white, musical comedy starring Gloria Jean, Ian Hunter, and Donald O'Connor. It is the only film starring Jean and O'Connor that doesn't also star Peggy Ryan, another one of the talented teenagers at Universal Studios.

Cast 

 Gloria Jean as Victoria Peabody
 Ian Hunter as Tom Peabody
 Donald O'Connor as Ricky Ives
 Frieda Inescort as Portia Winthrop
 Louise Allbritton as Edie Ives
 Mary Lou Harrington as Constance Peabody
 Raymond Roe as Carleton Winthrop
 Charles Coleman as Tilton
 Leon Belasco as Orchestra Leader
 Beatrice Roberts as Bernice
 unbilled players include Mantan Moreland

Reception
The New York Times called it "a modest bit of comedy and romance... a fairly amusing film."

References

External links 
 
 

1943 films
Films directed by Charles Lamont
Films scored by Frank Skinner
American black-and-white films
Universal Pictures films
1943 musical comedy films
American musical comedy films
1940s American films